Reagitator: Revenge of the Parody is a 2017 American horror comedy film directed by Dylan Greenberg about a mad doctor. It is based on H.P. Lovecraft's Herbert West--Reanimator.

Synopsis 
A beautiful aristocrat (Amanda Flowers) is resurrected by mad doctor ORBERT WESCRAFT (Jurgen Azazel Munster) at the request of her obsessed husband (Alan Merrill). When she rebels against the Doctor and joins a cult of the undead, it's pandemonium as the sinister creatures resurrect a giant monster to destroy all mortals. Two wacky journalists (Yolpie Kaiser, Mickala McFarlane) a mad teenage girl bent on revenge (Sofe Cote) and a perma tripping boy genius (Max Husten) must save the world.

Cast 

 Amanda Flowers as Claudia Merryweather
 Jurgen Azazeal Munster as Dr. Orbert Wescraft
 Aurelio Voltaire as Verum the LoveSick Butler
 Alan Merrill as Alan Merryweather
 Schoolly D as The President of the United States
 Kansas Bowling as Nancy the Demon Cheerleader
 Sofe Cote as Margaret East
 Elizabeth D'Ambrosio as Maude East
 Lloyd Kaufman as The Chief of Police
 Mr. Lobo as Narrator / The Author
 Howie Pyro as End of the World Man
 Purple Pam as Deputy Pam

References

External links 
 

2017 films
2017 horror films
American comedy horror films
American independent films
2010s exploitation films
Parodies of horror
2010s comedy horror films
2017 independent films
2017 comedy films
2010s English-language films
2010s American films